Saint-Jean-de-Monts is a commune in the Vendée department in the Pays de la Loire region in western France.

Geography

The town is situated in the west of the département, between Notre-Dame-de-Monts and Saint-Hilaire-de-Riez. It is split in two by a long plantation of pine trees, stretching from north to south along the coast. The centre-ville lies to the east of the cordon, while the seafront forms a center to the west.

Saint-Jean-de-Monts is known for its sandy beach, more than eight kilometres long. Due to its often low tides, it offers a great area for walkers, fishermen, and beach games.

The town is noteworthy for the recent restoration of its seafront, a town planning operation taking over five years to complete. The result now means a network of footpaths and cycle tracks are enhanced by plants, flowers and shrubs.

The predominantly flat terrain has allowed for the development of a vast 500 km² network of cyclepaths, known as the Sentiers Cyclables de la Vendée. These paths stretch from the island of Noirmoutier in the north, south past Saint-Gilles-Croix-de-Vie.

Climate

Saint-Jean-de-Monts has a oceanic climate (Köppen climate classification Cfb) closely bordering on a warm-summer Mediterranean climate (Csb).

History
Since 1867, bathers have been coming to the beach at Saint-Jean-de-Monts in large numbers, and since 1892 it has been the inspiration for many artists. The original church still lies in the center of the old village.

Demographics

Places of interest
 The pier on the beach (built in 1964) acts as a pontoon over the sea, and is a popular location for fishermen and walkers, although, unfortunately, during the storm of February 2010, the pier was significantly damaged. It has been completely deconstructed during the winter 2011. The new version of the pier was finished in 2013.
 A sculpture of two birds is in memory of Auguste Lepère and Charles Milcendeau.
 A sculpture by Henry MURAIL (1932-2012), La Baigneuse, at the end of "avenue de la mer", in front of the sea (1999).
 The national forest of 280 hectares, in the heart of the Breton / Vendée marshes, was planted under Napoléon III.

Gallery

See also
 Communes of the Vendée department

References

External links

 Official website 
 Tourisme Saint-Jean-de-Monts 

Communes of Vendée
Populated coastal places in France